Classic Albums is a British documentary series about pop, rock and heavy metal albums that are considered the best or most distinctive of a well-known band or musician or that exemplify a stage in the history of music.

Format
The TV series was made by Isis Productions and distributed by Eagle Rock Entertainment. It is shown on various broadcasters including BBC, ITV, Sky Arts, VH1 and VH1 Classic. They are also available on DVD. The show is similar in structure to VH1's short-lived 2001 series Ultimate Albums.

The music, and its production, is dissected by the musicians and/or producer playing the multitrack recordings and singling out tracks that one does not usually consciously hear when listening to the music, giving insight into the way the sound is built up. Also, the individual musicians play back pieces, which are then blended with the original recording. Almost all songs are dealt with, focusing almost entirely on the music itself, how it was composed/realised. Personal aspects of the band or members are occasionally dealt with, but mostly only if they serve this purpose. 

TV episodes are 50 minutes long but the DVD releases contain much additional material. All the releases in this series are done with the co-operation and full authorisation of the artists involved. The series producers are Nick de Grunwald and Martin R Smith. Various directors have been used for the series but the majority of the programmes have been directed by Bob Smeaton, Matthew Longfellow and Jeremy Marre.

History
The television series is unrelated to a radio show devised by radio producer John Pidgeon as a vehicle for Roger Scott, following the disc jockey's move from Capital Radio to BBC Radio 1 in 1988. The first hour-long series, produced independently by Pidgeon and Scott, opened with Dire Straits' Brothers in Arms in May 1989, followed by The Rolling Stones' Beggars Banquet, Genesis' Invisible Touch, Pink Floyd's The Dark Side of the Moon, The Who's Who's Next, Fleetwood Mac's Rumours, the Beach Boys' Pet Sounds, The Police's Synchronicity, Eagles' Hotel California and U2's The Joshua Tree. Scott died of cancer five months later, and the second series aired posthumously. Further programmes were presented by Richard Skinner.

The first episode of Classic Albums was actually a documentary called "The Making of Sgt. Pepper". This documentary focused on The Beatles' landmark album and was produced in much the same way as the Classic Albums series. Isis Productions and Nick de Grunwald helped co-produce this documentary and it helped lay the template for the Classic Albums series. It aired in 1992 both on the Disney Channel in the United States and ITV's The South Bank Show in the UK.

Episodes
The albums that have been covered are:

Dutch episodes
In the Netherlands, special episodes were produced exploring landmark Dutch albums. There were two series produced for two different channels.

The first ran in 1997 on the channel NCRV, in between episodes from the BBC series. These were never released on dvd.
 Q65 - Revolution (1966)
 Boudewijn de Groot - Voor de overlevenden  (1966)
 Cuby + Blizzards - Groeten uit Grollo (1967)
 The Outsiders - Outsiders (1967)
 Focus - Focus II (Moving Waves) (1971)
 Kayak - Royal Bed Bouncer (1975)
The second ran in 2011-2012 on the channel VPRO.
 Shocking Blue - At Home (1969) including "Venus" (1969)
 Herman Brood - Shpritsz (1978)
 De Dijk - Niemand in de Stad (1989)
 Bettie Serveert - Palomine (1992)
 Caro Emerald - Deleted Scenes from the Cutting Room Floor (2010)

References

External links
IMDb Classic Albums listing episode listing
Radio Rewind's biography of Roger Scott
Rock's Backpages biography of John Pidgeon

1989 British television series debuts
2021 British television series endings
1980s British music television series
1990s British music television series
2000s British music television series
2010s British music television series
2020s British music television series
British documentary television series
Documentary television series about music
BBC television documentaries
VH1 music shows
English-language television shows